ClexaCon is an annual fan convention focused on female members of the LGBTQ community. The convention is named after the "ship" name for Clarke and Lexa, characters on the CW series The 100. The inaugural ClexaCon was held at Bally's Hotel and Casino from March 3–5, 2017, in Las Vegas, Nevada.

History
In 2016, the character Lexa on the CW series The 100 was killed, a move that was criticized as continuing the "dead lesbian syndrome" or "bury your gays" trope in film and television.

In response, Holly Winebarger, Nicole Hand and Emily Maroutian organized ClexaCon as an event to "move the conversation forward in a positive way." Initially planned as a gathering of roughly 100 people, word of mouth and social media allowed the convention to grow significantly larger. The original founders were later joined by Ashley Arnold and Danielle Jablonski, who presently co-own and direct the convention and its parent company, Dash Productions.

At the 2019 event, vendors, attendees, staff, and guests noticed a drastic plummet in both attendance, and quality of the show. This prompted vendors to write a letter to the new con-runners, which gained media attention from several online outlets. The term "Clexapocalypse" was coined as a result, with many drawing comparisons to DashCon.

Event history

Reception 

ClexaCon was met with a positive reception for its diversity in panels, its variety of guests, and its empowering workshops.

Convention organizers reported challenges in booking guests for ClexaCon's first year, as many talent agents feared the convention would either fail or be canceled. In an interview, organized recalled it taking between four and six months in order to secure certain guests, as the agents wanted to see if the convention was legitimate.

See also
 GaymerX, an LGBTQ-focused video game convention
 Flame Con, an LGBTQ-focused comic convention

References

External links 

 Official Website

LGBT conferences
Fan conventions
Events in Las Vegas